Ishmaa'ily "Ish" Yuwsha Kitchen (born August 24, 1988) is a former American football nose tackle. He was signed by the Baltimore Ravens as an undrafted free agent in 2012. He played college football for Kent State University. Kitchen has also been a member of the Cleveland Browns, Detroit Lions, New England Patriots, and Tampa Bay Buccaneers.

College
Kitchen played college football at Kent State. In his senior year, he started 6 games at the nose tackle position. In his junior year, he played in all 12 games in which he recorded 22 tackles for the season. In his sophomore year, he played in 12 games.

Professional career

Baltimore Ravens
He signed with the Baltimore Ravens as an undrafted free agent. On August 31, 2012, he was released.

Cleveland Browns
On September 1, 2012, he was claimed off waivers by the Cleveland Browns. During the 2014-2015 season Kitchen came out with a new sack dance called the "Kitchen Slam." During this celebration Kitchen acted like he was stirring a pot of dough in the kitchen and then slammed it onto the ground. His sack dance caught on and was later voted the best sack dance in the NFL. Kitchen was released by the Browns on September 1, 2015.

Detroit Lions 
On October 8, 2015, Kitchen signed with the Detroit Lions. He was later released on October 23, 2015.

New England Patriots
On December 16, 2015, Kitchen was signed to the active roster of the New England Patriots. He was cut on December 22, 2015 to make room on the roster for Steven Jackson. The Patriots re-signed Kitchen to their 53-man roster on December 30, 2015.

The Patriots released Kitchen on April 15, 2016.

Tampa Bay Buccaneers
On August 15, 2016, Kitchen was signed by the Buccaneers. On August 28, 2016, Kitchen was waived by the Buccaneers.

In popular culture
In 2015, Kitchen appeared in the Key & Peele skit 'East-West Bowl 3', a Comedy Central Super Bowl special which featured NFL players with unusual names.

References

External links
Baltimore Ravens bio
Cleveland Browns bio
Kent State Golden Flashes bio

1988 births
Living people
Players of American football from Youngstown, Ohio
American football defensive tackles
Kent State Golden Flashes football players
Cleveland Browns players
Detroit Lions players
New England Patriots players
Tampa Bay Buccaneers players